The Battle of La Prairie was an attack made on the French colonial settlement of La Prairie, New France on August 11, 1691 by an English, Mohawk and Mohican force coming north from Albany, New York. The force, led by Major Pieter Schuyler, initially intended to attack Montreal, but was repulsed with significant casualties by the French and their Indian allies.

Background

During the summer of 1691, an English and Indian force led by Major Pieter Schuyler, consisting of 120 militiamen from Albany and 146 warriors from the Mohawk and Mohican tribes, attacked French colonial settlements along the Richelieu River south of Montreal. Louis-Hector de Callière, the local French governor, responded by amassing 700-800 French marines, militiamen and Indian allies at Fort Laprairie, on the south shore of the Saint Lawrence River.

Battle

Schuyler's men surprised the much larger French force in a rainstorm just before dawn on August 11, inflicting severe casualties before withdrawing towards the Richelieu River. The Anglo-Indian force might have remained intact but instead was intercepted by a French force of 160 men led by Philippe Clément du Vuault de la Valrennes that had been detached to block the road to Chambly. The two sides fought in vicious hand-to-hand combat for approximately an hour, before Schuyler's men broke through the French and retreated.

Aftermath

The French had suffered the most casualties during Schuyler's initial ambush, but the casualties the Albany force suffered after Valrennes' counterattack meant that they had incurred the greater proportion of loss. Instead of continuing his raids, Schuyler was forced to retreat back to Albany. The battle was also the subject of a 19th-century poem by William Douw Schuyler-Lighthall. In 1921, the site of Valrennes' counterattack was designated a National Historic Site of Canada.

Notes

References
 
 
"The Battle of La Prairie", by W.D. Schuyler-Lighthall

Further reading
 Chartrand, René; Canadian Military Heritage Vol. 1: 1000 - 1754; 1993, Art Global, 
 Adams, Arthur G. The Hudson Through the Years Fordham University Press, 1996. 

Battle of La Prairie
1691 in New France
17th century in Canada
17th century in Quebec
Battles of the Beaver Wars
Battles involving Canada
Conflicts in Quebec
King William's War
Battle of